Inning is a municipality in Bavaria, Germany, in the district of Starnberg, in the Regierungsbezirk of Oberbayern. It lies on the shores of lake Ammersee.

References

Starnberg (district)
Ammersee